"A picture is worth a thousand words" is an adage in multiple languages meaning that complex and sometimes multiple ideas can be conveyed by a single still image, which conveys its meaning or essence more effectively than a mere verbal description.

History
In March 1911, the Syracuse Advertising Men's Club held a banquet to discuss journalism and publicity. This was reported in two articles. In an article in The Post-Standard covering this event, the author quoted Arthur Brisbane (not Tess Flanders as previously reported here and elsewhere) as saying: "Use a picture. It's worth a thousand words."  In an article in the Printers' Ink, the same quote is attributed to Brisbane

A similar phrase, "One Look Is Worth A Thousand Words", appears in a 1913 newspaper advertisement for the Piqua Auto Supply House of Piqua, Ohio.

Early use of the exact phrase appears in a 1918 newspaper advertisement for the San Antonio Light, which says:

One of the Nation's Greatest Editors Says:
One Picture is Worth a Thousand Words The San Antonio Light's Pictorial Magazine of the War
Exemplifies the truth of the above statement—judging from the warm
reception it has received at the hands of the Sunday Light readers.

The modern use of the phrase is generally attributed to Fred R. Barnard. Barnard wrote this phrase in the advertising trade journal Printers' Ink, promoting the use of images in advertisements that appeared on the sides of streetcars.  The December 8, 1921, issue carries an ad entitled, "One Look is Worth A Thousand Words." Another ad by Barnard appears in the March 10, 1927, issue with the phrase "One Picture Worth Ten Thousand Words", where it is labeled a Chinese proverb. The 1949 Home Book of Proverbs, Maxims, and Familiar Phrases quotes Barnard as saying he called it "a Chinese proverb, so that people would take it seriously."  Nonetheless, the proverb soon after became popularly attributed to Confucius. The actual Chinese expression "Hearing something a hundred times isn't better than seeing it once" (p bǎi wén bù rú yī jiàn) is sometimes introduced as an equivalent, as Watts's "One showing is worth a hundred sayings". This was published as early as 1966 discussing persuasion and selling in a book on engineering design.

Equivalents
Despite this modern origin of the popular phrase, the sentiment has been expressed by earlier writers. For example, Leonardo da Vinci wrote that a poet would be "overcome by sleep and hunger before [being able to] describe with words what a painter is able to [depict] in an instant." The Russian writer Ivan Turgenev wrote in 1861, "The drawing shows me at one glance what might be spread over ten pages in a book." The quote is sometimes attributed to Napoleon Bonaparte, who said "A good sketch is better than a long speech". This is sometimes translated today as "A picture is worth a thousand words."

Similar phrases

A scientific formula is worth a thousand pictures
Computer scientist Edsger Dijkstra once remarked, "A picture may be worth a thousand words, a formula is worth a thousand pictures."

Spoof
The phrase has been spoofed by computer scientist John McCarthy, to make the opposite point: "As the Chinese say, 1001 words is worth more than a picture."

See also
 The Commissar Vanishes
 Ekphrasis

References

Sources
 The Dictionary of Clichés by James Rogers (Ballantine Books, New York, 1985).

Further reading
 

1910s neologisms
Culture of Syracuse, New York
English proverbs
Photography
Visualization (graphics)
1000 (number)